Dominik Koepfer (born 29 April 1994) is a German professional tennis player. He has achieved a career-high ATP singles ranking of world No. 50 on 10 May 2021, and a doubles ranking of No. 92 on 14 February 2022.
He played college tennis at Tulane University.

Professional career

2017: ATP debut
Koepfer made his ATP main draw debut at the Winston-Salem Open as a lucky loser. He won his first ATP Challenger Tour title in doubles at the 2017 Columbus Challenger, partnering Denis Kudla.

2018: First ATP win
Koepfer won his first match on the ATP Tour, again as a lucky loser at the Winston-Salem Open, defeating Tennys Sandgren.

2019: First Challenger title, Grand Slam debut, US Open fourth round
By winning his first Challenger in singles at the Ilkley Trophy Koepfer gained a wildcard for the 2019 Wimbledon Championships. There, he won his first Grand Slam main draw match by defeating Filip Krajinović in the first round before losing to Diego Schwartzman in straight sets.

He reached for the first time the fourth round of the 2019 US Open as a qualifier, where he lost to Daniil Medvedev in four sets.

2020: First Masters 1000 quarterfinal
Koepfer reached his first ATP Tour Masters 1000 quarterfinal at the Italian Open.

He reached the second round of the 2020 French Open for the first time where he lost to Stan Wawrinka in four sets.

2021: Top 50 debut, two Grand Slams third rounds
Koepfer started his season at the first edition of the Great Ocean Road Open. He lost in the first round to Australian Christopher O'Connell. At the Australian Open, he was defeated in the second round by third seed and last year finalist, Dominic Thiem.

Seeded sixth at the Córdoba Open, Koepfer was eliminated in the first round by Federico Coria. In Buenos Aires, he fell in the second round to fifth seed Albert Ramos Viñolas. At the Mexican Open, he reached his first ATP tour semifinal beating Mexican wildcard Gerardo López Villaseñor, fourth seed Milos Raonic, and Cameron Norrie. He ended up losing to second seed, compatriot, and eventual champion, Alexander Zverev. With this result, Koepfer climbed into the top 60 in the rankings to a career-high of No. 54 in singles. At the Miami Open, he was beaten in the first round by Hugo Gaston.

Koepfer began the clay-court season at the Monte-Carlo Masters. Getting past qualifying, he lost in the first round to fellow qualifier Marco Cecchinato. Next, he competed at the Barcelona Open. He was defeated in the first round by fellow leftie Corentin Moutet. Playing in Munich, he was eliminated in the second round by seventh seed, compatriot, and eventual finalist Jan-Lennard Struff. At the Madrid Open, he was beaten in his second-round match by 16th seed Cristian Garín. His final tournament before the second Grand slam of the year was the Geneva Open. He upset seventh seed Benoît Paire in a three-set first round victory. He ended up losing in the quarterfinals to third seed and eventual champion, Casper Ruud. At the French Open, he reached the third round for the first time and was defeated by eighth seed, former world number one, and 2009 champion Roger Federer.

Koepfer opened his grass-court season at the Stuttgart Open. He lost in the first round to Jurij Rodionov. In Halle, he faced third seed Alexander Zverev in the first round. He pushed Zverev to three sets but ended up losing the match. At Wimbledon, he made it to the third round for the first time where he fell to eighth seed Roberto Bautista Agut.

After Wimbledon, Koepfer played at the Hamburg Open. He was eliminated in the second round by top seed Stefanos Tsitsipas. Representing Germany at the Summer Olympics, he reached the third round and lost to sixth seed and eventual bronze medalist, Pablo Carreño Busta.

Starting his US Open preparation at the Canadian Open, Koepfer was defeated in the first round of qualifying by Canadian wildcard Peter Polansky. In Cincinnati, he fell in the final round of qualifying to Marcos Giron. However, he earned a spot into the main draw. He was eliminated in the second round by seventh seed Pablo Carreño Busta. Seeded 16th at the Winston-Salem Open, he made it to the third round where he was beaten by top seed Pablo Carreño Busta. At the US Open, he lost in the second round to second seed and eventual champion, Daniil Medvedev.

Competing at the first edition of the San Diego Open, Koepfer was defeated in the first round by Cameron Norrie. At the Indian Wells Masters, he fell in the first round to Emil Ruusuvuori in three sets. In Vienna, he was eliminated in the final round of qualifying by Gianluca Mager. Entering the main draw as a lucky loser, he lost in the first round to Lorenzo Sonego. At the Paris Masters, he lost in the final round of qualifying to Miomir Kecmanović. Due to the withdrawal of Jenson Brooksby, he entered the tournament's main draw as a lucky loser. He defeated Andy Murray in the first round; he had to save seven match points to get the victory in one of the top-5 comebacks for 2021 season. In the second round, he upset ninth seed Félix Auger-Aliassime. With that win, he ended the Canadian's hopes for the ATP finals. In the third round, he lost to seventh seed Hubert Hurkacz.

2022: Loss of form, out of clay season & of top 200
At the 2022 Australian Open he reached the second round defeating Carlos Taberner.
He skipped the entire clay season and his ranking plummeted down to No. 149 on 18 July 2022, out of the top 150 at No. 159 on 22 August 2022 and further out of the top 250 at No. 259 on 7 November 2022.

Following his title at the 2022 Calgary National Bank Challenger, he returned to the top 200 at world No. 195 climbing 64 positions up in the rankings on 14 November 2022 only to drop again to No. 202 on 28 November 2022.

Performance timelines

Singles
Current through the 2022 ATP Tour

Doubles

ATP Challenger and ITF Futures finals

Singles: 10 (6–4)

Doubles: 5 (2–3)

Record against top 10 players
Koepfer's match record against players who have been ranked in the top 10. Only ATP Tour main draw matches are considered. Players who have been No. 1 are in boldface.

  Félix Auger-Aliassime 1–0
  Gaël Monfils 1–0
  Andy Murray 1–0
  Milos Raonic 1–0
  Cameron Norrie 1–1
  Taylor Fritz 1–2
  Novak Djokovic 0–1
  Roger Federer 0–1
  Hubert Hurkacz 0–1
  Karen Khachanov 0–1
  Casper Ruud 0–1
  Diego Schwartzman 0–1
  Dominic Thiem 0–1
  Stefanos Tsitsipas 0–1
  Stan Wawrinka 0–1
  Pablo Carreño Busta 0–2
  Daniil Medvedev 0–2
  Andrey Rublev 0–2
  Alexander Zverev 0–2
  Roberto Bautista Agut 0–3

* .

Wins over top 10 players
Koepfer has a  record against players who were, at the time the match was played, ranked in the top 10.

References

External links
 
 
 

1994 births
Living people
German male tennis players
People from Furtwangen im Schwarzwald
Sportspeople from Freiburg (region)
Tennis players from Tampa, Florida
Tulane Green Wave men's tennis players
Olympic tennis players of Germany
Tennis players at the 2020 Summer Olympics
Tennis people from Baden-Württemberg